CatalunyaCaixa was the trading name of Catalunya Banc S.A., a Spanish bank with headquarters in Barcelona and owned by Banco Bilbao Vizcaya Argentaria (BBVA), and absorbed by it in 2016. Its area of influence is located mainly in Catalonia. It was the fourth-largest savings bank in Spain in terms of consolidated assets, with €81.020 billion.

It was founded on 1 July 2010 by the fusion of Caixa Catalunya, Caixa Tarragona and Caixa Manresa. The new savings bank had 1,212 branches and over 4 million customers.

During 2011 and 2012, CatalunyaCaixa received a total of €12.052 billion capital investment from the Spanish government's Fondo de Reestructuración Ordenada Bancaria (Fund for Orderly Bank Restructuring). The September 2011 capital injection effectively nationalised the bank, raising FROB's ownership to 89.74%.

In 2015, CatalunyaCaixa was purchased by Spanish banking group BBVA for a total of €1.187 billion.

References

External links

CatalunyaCaixa

Defunct banks of Spain
Companies based in Barcelona
Banks established in 2010
Banco Bilbao Vizcaya Argentaria
2010 establishments in Catalonia